Sitaara is a 1984 Indian Telugu-language drama film written and directed by Vamsy. The film marked the debut of Bhanupriya in Telugu film industry. The film was adapted from Vamsy's own novel Mahal lo Kokila. The film deals with the friendship of two people in the backdrop of peasants, zamindars, Indian movie world, and paparazzi. Upon release, the film received very positive reviews and remained a cult classic, and the soundtrack became all time chart-buster. The film has garnered three National Film Awards, and was screened at the 1984 International Film Festival of India, the Moscow Film Festival, and the Asian Film Festival.

Plot
Devdas (Subhalekha Sudhakar) is a professional photographer. Once, on a train, he meets a strange melancholic woman (Bhanupriya) who boards the train without a proper ticket. He helps her with the money and tries to strike up a conversation. She only tells him that her name is "Sitaara" and that she has nowhere to go in the big city. The reticent Sitara intrigues Devdas, who takes pity on her position and offers her shelter at his home. Devdas sees the photogenic face of Sitaara and helps her become a model and film star. Eventually, as he manages her dates and schedules, he develops a liking for her. When Sitaara vehemently refuses to go to a certain village for shooting, he gets insulted by the producer. An upset Devdas demands an explanation and forces her to reveal her traumatic past.

Sitaara reveals that she is the surviving sister of a deceased protective and proud zamindar. She was always kept indoors and restrained by her brother, as was the custom of rich landlords of the time. The zamindar had heavy debts and concealed this fact from the people of the village, hiding the misfortune behind the walls of his palace, with hopes of winning a case in the court that would then restore the ancestral wealth and thence, the glory of his family.

During Dasara, a group of drama artists come to the village to perform and make their living. Every day, they start their performance first at the zamindar's home per the custom. The zamindar is away and there is no one to watch or reward them. The youngest artist of the troupe, Raju is irritated by this, but others in the troupe convince him to perform in front of the zamindar's closed doors. One day, Sitaara watches Raju's performance through a broken window and takes a liking for him. He sees her watching him, and the next day performs with even more vigour, surprising his colleagues.

Eventually, Sitaara falls in love with Raju and they go to the village fair together. When the zamindar learns of the affair, he quietly sends henchmen to kill Raju. When Sitaara finds out, unable to confront her brother, suffers silently. In the meantime, the zamindar loses his court case. Afraid of losing the prestige that he has been trying to save, he kills himself and makes it seem like a robbery gone wrong. Sitaara runs away from the village and meets Devdas on the train.

After her past is revealed, Devdas tries to help her out by going back to the village. He learns that Raju was not killed and tries to track him and leaves Sitaara alone in the city for a while. Meanwhile, Sitaara attempts suicide after coming to know that Devdas wanted to marry her, through the news in a film tabloid. Raju learns that Sitaara is searching for him and comes to the city. Devdas manages to unite them in the end.

Production
Vamsy approached Edida Nageswara Rao with the script for this film. Because his last film was not well received by the audience, he hesitated to make a movie, but he was convinced by their common friend Tadi Babji. In the initial script, the hero dies, but Nageswara Rao wanted the hero to be alive. So he changed the script to fulfill his wish.

Vasmy thought of roping in Radha for the lead role. But because of budget restrictions, Nageswara Rao asked him to choose another actress. Then he recollected Bhanupriya who had just visited their office that morning. They did a photoshoot and selected her as a heroine for their movie.

Vamsy selected Venkatagiri fort to be an apt location for their story. He knew Saikrishna Yachendra, the second son of Venkatagiri Raja. With that connection, they could easily get permission for shooting.

Cast
 Suman as Raju
 Bhanupriya as Sitara / Kokila
 Subhalekha Sudhakar as Devadas
 Sarath Babu as Chander
 Edida Sriram as Tilak
 J. V. Somayajulu
 Mallikarjuna Rao
 Rallapalli
 Sakshi Ranga Rao
 M. Prabhakar Reddy

Soundtrack

Awards

|-
| rowspan="4"|1985
| Edida Nageswara Rao & Vamsy
| National Film Award for Best Feature Film in Telugu
| 
|-
| S. Janaki
| National Film Award for Best Female Playback Singer
| 
|-
| Anil Malnad
| National Film Award for Best Editing
| 
|-
| S. P. Ramanadham
| Nandi Award for Best Audiographer
| 
|}

References

External links
 

1984 films
Indian drama films
Films about actors
Films about entertainers
Films about mass media people
Films about filmmaking
Films about screenwriters
1980s Telugu-language films
Films directed by Vamsy
Films based on Indian novels
Indian films based on actual events
Films scored by Ilaiyaraaja
Films whose editor won the Best Film Editing National Award
Best Telugu Feature Film National Film Award winners
1984 drama films
Drama films based on actual events